Eugenia Sheldon Chapman (January 10, 1923 – September 30, 1994) was an American educator and politician.

Early life and career
Eugenia Sheldon was born in Fairhope, Alabama, on January 10, 1923. She earned a Bachelor of Education from Chicago Teachers College in 1944. She then took jobs teaching in Cicero, Illinois and at Chicago Public Schools. During the 1940s, she was also active as a counselor and director of children's summer camps. She taught schools in Chicago and Skokie, Illinois. In 1952, Chapman moved to Arlington Heights, Illinois. She was a president and charter member of the Arlington Heights chapter of the League of Women Voters. She served on the Township High School District 214 Board of Education from 1961 to 1964.

Political career
Chapman served as a Democratic member of the Illinois House of Representatives from 1965 to 1983. In 1970, she was a delegate to White House Conference on Children and Youth. From 1973 to 1975, she was a legislative member of the Illinois Commission on the Status of Women and chaired its Legislative Action Committee. She was a chief Illinois sponsor of the proposed Equal Rights Amendment, and of the Illinois Public Junior College Act. She chaired the Committee on Human Resources from 1975 to 1979 and chaired the Appropriations II Committee in 1980. She served as Democratic Whip from 1981 to 1983 making her the first woman to hold an Illinois House leadership position in state history. During her legislative career, she was awarded the best legislator award from Independent Voters of Illinois-Independent Precinct Organization multiple times.

In the 1982 United States House of Representatives elections, Chapman ran for Congress losing to John Porter receiving 41% of the vote. In 1983, Neil Hartigan named Chapman the Chief of the Division of Senior Citizen Advocacy and Coordinator for Community Education in Office of Illinois Attorney General. She served there until her retirement in 1989.

She served as a committeewoman from the 10th district on the Illinois Democratic Central Committee from 1983 until her death. Chapman died at the Northwest Community Continuing Care Center in Arlington Heights, Illinois.

References

External links

1923 births
1994 deaths
Politicians from Chicago
People from Arlington Heights, Illinois
People from Fairhope, Alabama
Chicago State University alumni
Educators from Illinois
American women educators
Women state legislators in Illinois
School board members in Illinois
Democratic Party members of the Illinois House of Representatives
20th-century American politicians
20th-century American women politicians